It's All On U, Vol. 1 is the 2nd studio album by rapper B.G., released on July 1, 1997, on Cash Money Records. The album features the first appearance of Hot Boys as a group. All the tracks were produced by Mannie Fresh. The album debuted at #17 on the Billboard Heatseekers Album Chart on July 19, 1997.

This album was re-released in 1999 after Cash Money signed a pressing and distribution deal with Universal in 1998.

Track listing 
All songs produced by Mannie Fresh.

References

1997 albums
B.G. (rapper) albums
Cash Money Records albums
Albums produced by Mannie Fresh